Blame It on You may refer to:

"Blame It on You", 2017 song by Charli XCX from her mixtape Number 1 Angel
"Blame It on You" (Jason Aldean song), 2019 song by American Jason Aldean from his album 9
"Blame It on You", 1986 song by Poison from their album Look What the Cat Dragged In
"Blame It on You", 2011 song by Swedish boy band Youngblood from their album Running Home to You

See also
"Blame It on Yourself", song by American band Ivy
"Blame It on Your Heart", song by Patty Loveless
"Blame It on Your Love", song by Charli XCX featuring Lizzo
"Blame It on Your Truck", song by Canadian country singer Kira Isabella